No Dice is the third studio album by British rock band Badfinger, issued by Apple Records and released on 9 November 1970. Their second album under the Badfinger name, but their first official album under that name, and first to include guitarist Joey Molland, No Dice significantly expanded the British group's popularity, especially abroad. The album included both the hit single "No Matter What" and the song "Without You", which would become a big hit for Harry Nilsson, and later a hit for Mariah Carey.

Background 

Although this was the band's second album released under the Badfinger name, the previous album, Magic Christian Music, was originally recorded as The Iveys but released as Badfinger. It was the band's first album recorded after new guitarist Joey Molland joined the group, replacing bassist Ron Griffiths, but Molland's addition caused Tom Evans to switch from rhythm guitar to bass. Badfinger would release five albums, generally their most successful recordings, with this line-up.

The model depicted on the album cover has never been formally identified. According to Molland, "the woman was a model hired by Gene Mahon and Richard DiLello for the shoot, they designed the cover, [and] we never actually met her." Molland continued that he asked Richard DiLello who the cover model was "at a Beatlefest in the 70s." DiLello stated that she was named Kathy, but not Kathie Molland who was a model.

Release 
No Dice peaked at number 28 on the Billboard Hot 200 chart. Widely praised in music reviews at the time, Rolling Stone magazine opined that it represented what the Beatles would have sounded like had they retained their initial formula.

The single from this LP, "No Matter What", peaked in the United States at number 8 on the Billboard Hot 100 chart in 1970. The song is often regarded as an early offering in the power pop genre. The album also contains the original version of "Without You". Although Badfinger did not release the song as a single in Europe or North America, it was taken to number 1 on the Billboard charts in 1972 by Harry Nilsson, and became a hit for Mariah Carey in 1994. "Without You" has been the top money-earner for Badfinger in publishing royalties, having been covered by over 180 artists. The song was also picked to provide the title for Dan Matovina's 1997 biography Without You: The Tragic Story Of Badfinger.

In October 1991, No Dice was digitally remastered at Abbey Road Studio by Ron Furmanek. The remastered album was released in 1992 by Capitol Records and Apple, with five previously unreleased bonus tracks. Of the bonus tracks, "Friends Are Hard to Find" was an outtake from the same Mal Evans-produced session that saw the recording of "No Matter What" and "Believe Me". "Get Down" was originally attempted with Evans, but the version here was recorded with Geoff Emerick. The three remaining tracks, "Mean, Mean Jemima", "Loving You", and "I'll Be the One", were recorded with Emerick between January and March 1971 (after the completion of No Dice) for the intended follow-up album that was never released.

Critical reception 

Reviewing for Creem in 1971, Mike Saunders wrote effusively about the album and the band itself: "Badfinger is one of the best songwriting groups around, one of the best singing groups anywhere, and now with an absolutely great lead guitarist in Pete Ham, they're really one fucking whale of a group." Robert Christgau was somewhat less enthusiastic, writing in Christgau's Record Guide: Rock Albums of the Seventies (1981): "I don't think these guys imitate the Beatles just so Paul will give them more hits — they've got hits of their own. But from the guitar parts (play 'Better Days' right after 'I Feel Fine') and harmonies (the Paul of 'I've Just Seen a Face' atop the Paul of 'Long Tall Sally') to concept and lineup, an imitation is what this is, modernized slightly via some relaxed countrification. They write almost well enough to get away with it, too. But somehow the song that stands out is 'Blodwyn,' a simulated (I think) English folk ditty about a swain and a spoon that has nothing to do with the Fab Four at all."

Track listing 

 Sides one and two were combined as tracks 1–12 on CD reissues.

2010 CD bonus tracks
 "I Can't Take It (Extended Version)" (Ham) – 4:14
 "Without You"(Mono Studio Demo Version) (Ham, Evans) – 3:57
 "Photograph (Friends are Hard to Find)" (Molland) – 3:24
 "Believe Me" (Alternate Version) (Evans) – 3:04
 "No Matter What" (Mono Studio Demo Version) (Ham) – 2:57

2010 digital bonus tracks
 "Love Me Do" (Instrumental Version) – 2:57
 "Get Down" (Alternate Version) – 5:13

Personnel 
Badfinger
 Pete Ham – lead and backing vocals, lead and rhythm guitars, piano, tack piano on "Midnight Caller", Fender Rhodes electric piano on "Without You"
 Tom Evans – lead and backing vocals, bass guitar
 Joey Molland – lead and backing vocals, rhythm and lead guitars
 Mike Gibbins – drums, backing vocals on "It Had To Be", lead vocals on "Loving You"

Additional personnel
 Geoff Emerick – producer
 Mal Evans – producer
 Mike Jarrett – mixing
 John Kurlander – engineer
 Richard Lush – engineer
 Keith Hodgson - additional session musician
 Steve Kolanijan – liner notes, sleeve notes
 Mike Jarratt – engineer, mixing
 Marcia McGovern – pre-production
 Roberta Ballard – production manager
 Gene Mahon – design
 Richard DiLello – design, photography
 'Kathy' - cover model 
 Ron Furmanek – digital mastering, mastering, mixing (CD re-release)

References

External links 
 

Badfinger albums
1970 albums
Apple Records albums
Albums recorded at Trident Studios
Albums produced by Geoff Emerick